Erskine Douglas Williamson (born 10 April 1886 in Edinburgh – 25 December 1923) was a Scottish geophysicist.

Life
Following degrees from the University of Edinburgh and a period on a Research Scholarship from the Carnegie Trust of Scotland, he was hired in 1914 by the Geophysical Laboratory of the Carnegie Institution in Washington DC, USA. In the nine years till his early death in 1923, he became known for experimental studies and theoretical calculations in high-pressure physics, physical chemistry, petrology, glass science and geodynamics. Shortly before his death, he published with Leason H. Adams what is regarded as one of the most important contributions to geophysics in the first half of the 20th century. The famous Adams–Williamson equation derived in that paper laid the theoretical foundations for determining the interior structure of the Earth from seismic velocities, and remains widely known and used to this day.

References

1886 births
1923 deaths
Scottish physicists
British geophysicists
Alumni of the University of Edinburgh